Francesco Tarducci, better known as Nesly Rice or Nesli, is an Italian singer and music producer for Teste Mobili Records. He is the younger brother of Italian rapper Fabri Fibra.

Tarducci released his first demo, Fitte Da Latte, in 1999 with the help of his brother Fabri Fibra.

Discography

Demo
Fitte Da Latte (1999)

Solo albums
Ego (2003)
Home (2004)
Le verità nascoste (2007)
Nesliving Vol.1 (2009) 
Fragile - Nesliving Vol.2 (2009) 
L'amore è qui (2010)
Nesliving Vol.3 - Voglio (2012)
Andrà tutto bene (2015)
Kill Karma (2016)
Vengo in pace (2019)

With Piante Grasse 
Cactus (2001)

References

External links
 Profile at MTV Italy.

Year of birth missing (living people)
Living people
Italian rappers
Italian pop singers